Saile Samuel da Silva Souza (born 14 September 2000), commonly known as Saile Souza is a Brazilian footballer who currently plays for Baniyas.

Career statistics

Club

Notes

References

External links

2000 births
Living people
Brazilian footballers
Association football midfielders
Campeonato Brasileiro Série C players
Campeonato Brasileiro Série D players
UAE Pro League players
Joinville Esporte Clube players
Baniyas Club players
Expatriate footballers in the United Arab Emirates
Brazilian expatriate sportspeople in the United Arab Emirates